The Sir Thomas Brisbane Planetarium is located on the grounds of the Brisbane Botanic Gardens in the suburb of Mount Coot-tha, Brisbane, Queensland, Australia. The Planetarium was officially opened on 24 May 1978.

The Planetarium is named after Sir Thomas Brisbane, governor of the colony of New South Wales (1821 - 1825) and well known Scottish astronomer who established the first significant observatory at Parramatta, Australia, in 1822 for mapping the southern skies.

The Planetarium features the 12.5m diameter Cosmic Skydome (hemispherical planetarium theatre) with a maximum concentric seating capacity of 130. Extensive space exploration and astronomy displays in the Planetarium's Foyer and Gallery include the 1969 Apollo 11 Moon landing with a replica of Neil Armstrong's space suit and a 1/48-scale Saturn V rocket, meteorites, and numerous models of spacecraft, rockets, and astronomical instruments. In 2018, a major permanent exhibit - Skylore: Aboriginal and Torres Strait Islander Astronomy - was installed in the Gallery. The original Zeiss star projector was removed from the Cosmic Skydome during the upgrade in 2010 and was placed on display in the foyer in early 2012. A replacement optical star projector by Ohira Tech was installed in the Cosmic Skydome in early 2013. A mini-theatre usually features a regularly updated Space Telescope Science Institute web feed. An observatory contains a permanently mounted Zeiss 15 cm refractor and a Meade 25.4 cm "Go To" Schmidt-Cassegrain telescope.

The Planetarium runs more than 1,300 regular shows per year in the Cosmic Skydome for public and school groups, and observing sessions in the observatory. During Financial Year 2017/2018, the Planetarium had more than 155,000 visitors with nearly 80,000 attending sessions in the Cosmic Skydome.

A major upgrade for the Planetarium was completed in June 2019 with a new digital projection system installed. Adding to the new Skylore Story a world first, The exhibit features some of Australia's leading Aboriginal and Torres Strait Islander Elders sharing their star knowledge for the first time. The content within this exhibition was sourced and curated by Dr Duane Hamacher, an astronomer and academic working closely with Aboriginal and Torres Strait Islander communities.

Access to the display areas and mini theatre is free. Admission charges apply for the Cosmic Skydome and the observatory. The Planetarium is closed on Mondays (except during most Queensland school holiday periods) and is usually closed for up to two weeks for servicing work following the December/January school holidays.

Outside exhibits adjacent to the Planetarium include a statue of Konstantin Tsiolkovsky, the Father of Cosmonautics and a large sundial in the Sundial Courtyard.

References

External links

 Sir Thomas Brisbane Planetarium - official website
 Brisbane Planetarium on Facebook - official Brisbane Planetarium on Facebook

Tourist attractions in Brisbane
Buildings and structures in Brisbane
Buildings and structures completed in 1978
Planetaria in Australia
Education in Brisbane
1978 establishments in Australia
Mount Coot-tha, Queensland